Paul Christie (born 9 February 1971 in  Sunderland, County Durham) is a former English cricketer.  Christie was a right-handed batsman who bowled left-arm medium-fast.

Christie made a single first-class appearance for the Marylebone Cricket Club against M Parkinson's World XI at the North Marine Road Ground, Scarborough.  In this match, he bowled 13 wicket-less overs for the cost of 63 runs in the World XIs first-innings, while in their second-innings he took 3 wickets for the cost of 57 runs from 14 overs.  In the Marylebone Cricket Club's first-innings he didn't bat, while in their second he was dismissed for a duck by Wasim Akram.  M Parkinson's World XI won the match by 257 runs.

In 1991, Christie made a single Minor Counties Championship for Durham against Hertfordshire.  With Durham being elevated to first-class status for the 1992 season, his services were not retained by the county.

References

External links
Paul Christie at ESPNcricinfo
Paul Christie at CricketArchive

1971 births
Living people
Cricketers from Sunderland
English cricketers
Marylebone Cricket Club cricketers
Durham cricketers